Sidney Arthur Lumet (June 25, 1924 – April 9, 2011) was an American film director. He was nominated five times for the Academy Award: four for Best Director for 12 Angry Men (1957), Dog Day Afternoon (1975), Network (1976), and The Verdict (1982) and one for Best Adapted Screenplay for Prince of the City (1981).  He did not win an individual Academy Award but did receive an Academy Honorary Award, and 14 of his films were nominated for Oscars.

According to The Encyclopedia of Hollywood, Lumet was one of the most prolific filmmakers of the modern era, directing more than one movie a year on average since his directorial debut in 1957. Turner Classic Movies notes his "strong direction of actors", "vigorous storytelling" and the "social realism" in his best work. Film critic Roger Ebert described him as "one of the finest craftsmen and warmest humanitarians among all film directors". Lumet was also known as an "actor's director", having worked with the best of them during his career, probably more than "any other director". Sean Connery, who acted in five of his films, considered him one of his favorite directors, and one who had that "vision thing".

A member of the inaugural class at New York's Actors Studio, Lumet began his directorial career in Off-Broadway productions, then became a highly efficient TV director. His first movie, 12 Angry Men (1957), was a courtroom drama centered on a tense jury deliberation. Lumet subsequently divided his energies among political and social drama films, as well as adaptations of literary plays and novels, big stylish stories, New York–based black comedies, and realistic crime dramas, including Serpico and Prince of the City. As a result of directing 12 Angry Men, he was also responsible for leading the first wave of directors who made a successful transition from TV to movies.

In 2005, Lumet received an Academy Award for Lifetime Achievement for his "brilliant services to screenwriters, performers, and the art of the motion picture". Two years later he concluded his career with the drama Before the Devil Knows You're Dead (2007). A few months after Lumet's death in April 2011, a retrospective celebration of his work was held at New York's Lincoln Center with numerous speakers and film stars. In 2015, Nancy Buirski directed By Sidney Lumet, a documentary about his career, which aired as part of PBS's American Masters series in January 2017.

Biography

Early years

Lumet was born in Philadelphia and grew up in the Lower East Side neighborhood of Manhattan. He studied theater acting at the Professional Children's School of New York and Columbia University.

Lumet's parents, Baruch and Eugenia (née Wermus) Lumet, were veterans of the Yiddish theatre, and were Polish-Jewish emigrants to the United States. His father, an actor, director, producer and writer, was born in Warsaw. Lumet's mother, who was a dancer, died when he was a child. He had an older sister. He made his professional debut on the radio at age four and his stage debut at the Yiddish Art Theatre at age five. As a child he also appeared in many Broadway productions, including 1935's Dead End and Kurt Weill's The Eternal Road.

In 1935, aged 11, he appeared in a Henry Lynn short film Papirossen (meaning "Cigarettes" in Yiddish), co-produced by radio star Herman Yablokoff. The film was shown in a theatrical play with the same title, based on the hit song "Papirosn". The play and short film appeared in the Bronx McKinley Square Theatre. In 1939, he made his only feature-length film appearance, at age 15, in ...One Third of a Nation...

World War II interrupted his early acting career and he spent four years in the U.S. Army. After returning from service as a radar repairman stationed in India and Burma (1942–1946), he became involved with the Actors Studio, and then formed his own theater workshop. He organized an Off-Broadway group and became its director, and continued directing in summer stock theatre, while teaching acting at the High School of Performing Arts. He was the senior drama coach at the new 46th St. building of "Performing Arts". The 25-year-old Lumet directed the drama department in a production of The Young and Fair.

Early career

Lumet began his career as a director with Off-Broadway productions and then evolved into a highly respected TV director. After working off-Broadway and in summer stock, he began directing television in 1950, after working as an assistant to friend and then-director Yul Brynner. He soon developed a "lightning quick" method for shooting due to the high turnover required by television. As a result, while working for CBS he directed hundreds of episodes of Danger (1950–55), Mama (1949–57), and You Are There (1953–57), a weekly series which featured Walter Cronkite in one of his early television appearances. Lumet chose Cronkite for the role of anchorman "because the premise of the show was so silly, was so outrageous, that we needed somebody with the most American, homespun, warm ease about him", Lumet said.

He also directed original plays for Playhouse 90, Kraft Television Theatre and Studio One, directing around 200 episodes, which established him as "one of the most prolific and respected directors in the business", according to Turner Classic Movies. His ability to work quickly while shooting carried over to his film career. Because the quality of many of the television dramas was so impressive, several of them were later adapted as motion pictures.

His first movie, 12 Angry Men (1957), based on a CBS live play, was an auspicious beginning for Lumet. It was a critical success and established him as a director skilled at adapting properties from other mediums to motion pictures. Fully half of Lumet's complement of films originated in the theater.

A controversial TV show he directed in 1960 gained him notoriety: The Sacco-Vanzetti Story on NBC. According to The New York Times, the drama drew flack from the state of Massachusetts (where Sacco and Vanzetti were tried and executed) because it was thought to postulate that the condemned murderers were, in fact, wholly innocent. However, the resulting controversy actually did Lumet more good than harm, sending several prestigious film assignments his way.

He began adapting classic plays for both film and television, directing Marlon Brando, Joanne Woodward and Anna Magnani in the feature film The Fugitive Kind (1959), based on the Tennessee Williams play Orpheus Descending. He later directed a live television version of Eugene O'Neill's The Iceman Cometh, which was followed by his film, A View from the Bridge (1962), another psychological drama from the play written by Arthur Miller. This was followed by another Eugene O'Neill play turned to cinema, Long Day's Journey into Night (also 1962), with Katharine Hepburn gaining an Oscar nomination for her performance as a drug-addicted housewife; the four principal actors swept the acting awards at the 1962 Cannes Film Festival. It was also voted one of the year's "Ten Best Films" by The New York Times.

Directing style and subjects

Realism and energetic style
Film critic Owen Gleiberman has observed that Lumet was a "hardboiled straight-shooter", who, because he was trained during the golden Age of television in the 1950s, became noted for his energetic style of directing. The words "Sidney Lumet" and "energy", he adds, became synonymous: "The energy was there in the quietest moments. It was an inner energy, a hum of existence that Lumet observed in people and brought out in them...[when he] went into the New York streets...he made them electric:

Collaboration

Lumet generally insisted on the collaborative nature of the film, sometimes ridiculing the dominance of the "personal" director, writes film historian Frank P. Cunningham. As a result, Lumet became renowned among both actors and cinematographers for his openness to sharing creative ideas with the writer, actors, and other artists. Lumet "has no equal in the distinguished direction of superior actors", adds Cunningham, with many coming from the theater. He was able to draw powerful performances from actors such as Ralph Richardson, Marlon Brando, Richard Burton, Katharine Hepburn, James Mason, Sophia Loren, Geraldine Fitzgerald, Blythe Danner, Rod Steiger, Vanessa Redgrave, Paul Newman, Sean Connery, Henry Fonda, Dustin Hoffman, Albert Finney, Simone Signoret, and Anne Bancroft. "Give him a good actor, and he just might find the great actor lurking within", wrote film critic Mick LaSalle.

When necessary, Lumet chose untrained actors, but stated, "over ninety percent of the time I want the best tools I can get: actors, writers, lighting men, cameramen, propmen". Nonetheless, when he did use less experienced actors, he could still bring out superior and memorable acting performances. He did so with Nick Nolte, Anthony Perkins, Armand Assante, Jane Fonda, Faye Dunaway, Timothy Hutton and Ali MacGraw, who herself referred to him as "every actor's dream". In Fonda's opinion, "he was a master. Such control of his craft. He had strong, progressive values and never betrayed them".

Lumet believed that movies are an art, and "the amount of attention paid to movies is directly related to pictures of quality". Because he started his career as an actor, he became known as an "actor's director", and worked with the best of them over the years, a roster probably unequaled by any other director. Acting scholar Frank P. Tomasulo agrees, and points out that many directors who are able to understand acting from an actor's perspective, were all "great communicators".

According to film historians Gerald Mast and Bruce Kawin, Lumet's "sensitivity to actors and to the rhythms of the city have made him America's longest-lived descendant of the 1950s Neorealist tradition and its urgent commitment to ethical responsibility". They cite his early film The Hill (1965) as "one of the most politically and morally radical films of the 1960s". They add that beneath the social conflicts of Lumet's films lies the "conviction that love and reason will eventually prevail in human affairs", and that "law and justice will eventually be served – or not". His debut film, Twelve Angry Men, was an acclaimed picture in its day, representing a model for liberal reason and fellowship during the 1950s. The film and Lumet were nominated for Academy Awards, and he was nominated for the Director's Guild Award, with the film widely praised by critics.

The Encyclopedia of World Biography states that his films often featured actors who studied "Method acting", noted for portraying an earthy, introspective style. A leading example of such "Method" actors would be Al Pacino, who, early in his career, studied under Method acting guru Lee Strasberg. Lumet also preferred the appearance of spontaneity in both his actors and settings, which gave his films an improvisational look by shooting much of his work on location.

Rehearsal and preparation
Lumet was a strong believer in rehearsal, and felt that if you rehearse correctly the actor will not lose spontaneity. According to acting author Ian Bernard, he felt that it gives actors the "entire arc of the role", which gives them the freedom to find that "magical accident". Director Peter Bogdanovich asked him whether he rehearsed extensively before shooting, and Lumet said he liked to rehearse a minimum of two weeks before filming. During those weeks, recalls Faye Dunaway, who starred in Network (1976), he also blocked the scenes with his cameraman. As a result, she adds "not a minute is wasted while he's shooting, and that shows not only on the studio's budget, but it shows on the impetus of performance". She praises his style of directing in Network, in which she won her only Academy Award:

Partly because his actors were well rehearsed, he could execute a production in rapid order, which kept his productions within their modest budget. When filming Prince of the City (1981), for example, although there were over 130 speaking roles and 135 different locations, he was able to coordinate the entire shoot in 52 days. As a result, write historians Charles Harpole and Thomas Schatz, performers were eager to work with him as they considered him to be an "outstanding director of actors". The film's star, Treat Williams, said that Lumet was known for being "energetic":

Harpole adds that "whereas many directors disliked rehearsals or advising actors on how to build their character, Lumet excelled at both". He could thereby more easily give his performers a cinematic showcase for their abilities and help them deepen their acting contribution. Actor Christopher Reeve, who co-starred in Deathtrap (1982), also pointed out that Lumet knew how to talk technical language: "If you want to work that way – he knows how to talk Method, he knows how to improvise, and he does it all equally well".

Joanna Rapf, writing about the filming of The Verdict (1982), states that Lumet gave plenty of personal attention to his actors, whether listening to them or touching them. She describes how Lumet and star Paul Newman sat on a bench secluded from the main set, where Newman had taken his shoes off, to privately discuss an important scene about to be shot...the actors walk through their scenes before the camera rolls. This preparation was done because Lumet likes to shoot a scene in one take, two at the most. Newman liked to call him "Speedy Gonzales", adding that Lumet did not shoot more than he had to. "He doesn't give himself any protection. I know I would", Newman said.

Film critic Betsey Sharkey agrees, adding that "he was a maestro of one or two takes years before Clint Eastwood would turn it into a respected specialty". Sharkey recalls, "[Faye] Dunaway once told me that Lumet worked so fast it was as if he were on roller skates. A racing pulse generated by a big heart".

Character development
Biographer Joanna Rapf observes that Lumet had always been an independent director, and liked to make films about "men who summon courage to challenge the system, about the little guy against the system". This also includes the women characters as in Garbo Talks (1984). Its star, Anne Bancroft embodied the kind of character portrayal that attracted him: "a committed activist for all kinds of causes, who stands up for the rights of the oppressed, who is lively, outspoken, courageous, who refuses to conform for the sake of convenience, and whose understanding of life allows her to die with dignity ... Garbo Talks in many ways is a valentine to New York".

In an interview in 2006, he said that he had always been "fascinated by the human cost involved in following passions and commitments, and the cost those passions and commitments inflict on others". This theme is at the core of most of his movies, notes Rapf, such as his true-life films about of corruption in the New York City Police Department or in family dramas such as Daniel (1983).

Psychodramas
Film historian Stephen Bowles believes Lumet was most comfortable and effective as a director of serious psychodramas, as opposed to light entertainments. His Academy Award nominations, for example, were all for character studies of men in crisis, from his first film, Twelve Angry Men, to The Verdict. Lumet excelled at putting drama on the screen. Most of his characters are driven by obsessions or passions, such as the pursuit of justice, honesty, and truth, or jealousy, memory, or guilt. Lumet was intrigued by obsessive conditions, writes Bowles.

Lumet's protagonists tended to be antiheroes, isolated and unexceptional men who rebel against a group or institution. The most important criterion for Lumet was not simply whether the actions of the people are right or wrong, but whether they were  genuine and justified by the individual's conscience. Whistleblower Frank Serpico, for example, is the quintessential Lumet hero, whom he described as a "rebel with a cause".
 
An earlier example of psychodrama was The Pawnbroker (1964), starring Rod Steiger. In it, Steiger played a Holocaust survivor whose spirit had been broken and who lives day-to-day as a pawn shop manager in Harlem. Lumet used the film to examine, with flashbacks, the psychological and spiritual scars Steiger's character lives with, including his lost capacity to feel pleasure. Steiger, who made nearly 80 films, said during a TV interview that the film was his favorite as an actor.

Issues of social justice

Serpico (1973) was the first of four "seminal" films Lumet made during the 1970s that marked him as "one of the greatest filmmakers of his generation". It was the story of power and betrayal in the New York City police force, with an idealistic policeman battling impossible odds.

As Lumet was a child during the Depression, he grew up poor in New York City and witnessed the poverty and corruption all around him. It instilled in him at an early age the importance of justice for a democracy, a subject he tried to put in his films. He admitted, however, that he did not believe that the movie business itself has the power to change anything. "There is, as he says, a lot of 'shit' to deal with in the entertainment industry, but the secret of good work is to maintain your honesty and your passion". Film historian David Thomson writes of his films:

New York City settings
Lumet always preferred to work in New York City and shunned the dominance of Hollywood. As a director, he became strongly identified with New York City. "I always like being in Woody Allen's world", he said. He claimed that "the diversity of the City, its many ethnic neighborhoods, its art and its crime, its sophistication and its corruption, its beauty and its ugliness, all feed into what inspires him". He felt that in order to create, it is important to confront reality on a daily basis. For Lumet, "New York is filled with reality; Hollywood is a fantasyland".

He used New York City time and again as the backdrop – if not the symbol – of his "preoccupation with America's decline", according to film historians Scott and Barbara Siegel. Lumet was attracted to crime-related stories in New York City urban settings where the criminals get caught in a vortex of events they can neither understand nor control, but are forced to resolve.

Use of contemporary Jewish themes
Like other Jewish directors from New York such as Woody Allen, Mel Brooks, and Paul Mazursky, Lumet's characters often spoke overtly about controversial issues of the times. They felt unconstrained as filmmakers and their art became "filtered through their Jewish consciousness", wrote film historian David Desser. Lumet, like the others, sometimes turned to Jewish themes in order to develop ethnic sensibilities that were characteristic of contemporary American culture, by dynamically highlighting its "unique tensions and cultural diversity". This was partly reflected in Lumet's preoccupation with city life. His film A Stranger Among Us (1992), for example, is the story of a woman undercover police officer and her experiences in a Hasidic community within New York City.

The subject of "guilt", explains Desser, dominates many of Lumet's films. From his first feature film, 12 Angry Men (1957), in which a jury must decide the guilt or innocence of a young man, to Q&A (1990), in which a lawyer must determine the question of guilt and responsibility on the part of a maverick policeman, guilt is a common thread which runs through many of his films. In a film like Murder on the Orient Express (1974), all of the suspects are guilty.

His films were also characterized by a strong emphasis on family life, often showing tensions within the family. This emphasis on the family included "surrogate families", as in the police trilogy consisting of Serpico (1973), Prince of the City (1981), and Q & A. An "untraditional family" is also portrayed in Dog Day Afternoon (1975).

Directing techniques

Lumet had always preferred naturalism or realism, according to Joanna Rapf. He did not like the "decorator's look", where the camera could call attention to itself. He edited his films so the camera was unobtrusive. His cinematographer Ron Fortunato said "Sidney flips if he sees a look that's too artsy". Lumet disliked CinemaScope and never filmed in an aspect ratio wider than 1.85:1.

Partly because he was willing and able to take on so many significant social issues and problems, he achieved strong performances from lead actors with fine work from character actors. He is "one of the stalwart figures of New York moviemaking. He abides by good scripts, when he gets them", said critic David Thomson. Although critics gave varying opinions of his films, in general Lumet's body of work is held in high esteem. Most critics have described him as a sensitive and intelligent director, having good taste, the courage to experiment with his style, and a "gift for handling actors".

In a quote from his book, Lumet emphasized the logistics of directing:

Critic Justin Chang adds that Lumet's skill as a director and in developing strong stories, continued up to his last film in 2007, writing of his "nimble touch with performers, his ability to draw out great warmth and zesty humor with one hand and coax them toward ever darker, more anguished extremes of emotion with the other, was on gratifying display in his ironically titled final film, Before the Devil Knows You're Dead."

Vision of future films
In an interview with New York magazine, he said he expects to see more directors from different ethnic backgrounds and communities, telling their stories. "You know, I started out making films about Jews and Italians and Irish because I didn't know anything else".

Filmography

Honors and legacy 

Lumet has been recognized by the Academy of Motion Picture Arts and Sciences for the following films:
30th Academy Awards (1957): Best Director, nomination, 12 Angry Men
48th Academy Awards (1975): Best Director, nomination, Dog Day Afternoon
49th Academy Awards (1976): Best Director, nomination, Network
55th Academy Awards (1981): Best Adapted Screenplay, nomination, Prince of the City 
56th Academy Awards (1982): Best Director, nomination, The Verdict
77th Academy Awards (2004): Honorary Academy Award, win

Lumet has also received the Berlin International Film Festival's Golden Bear for 12 Angry Men. He received four nominations for the Cannes Film Festival Palme d'Or for the films Long Day's Journey into Night (1962), The Hill (1965), The Appointment (1969), and A Stranger Among Us (1992). He also received a Venice Film Festival Golden Lion award nomination for Prince of the City (1981).

According to film historian Bowles, Lumet succeeded in becoming a leading drama filmmaker partly because "his most important criterion [when directing] is not whether the actions of his protagonists are right or wrong, but whether their actions are genuine". And where those actions are "justified by the individual's conscience, this gives his heroes uncommon strength and courage to endure the pressures, abuses, and injustices of others". His films have thereby continually given us the "quintessential hero acting in defiance of peer group authority and asserting his own code of moral values".

Lumet's published memoir about his life in film, Making Movies (1996), is "extremely lighthearted and infectious in its enthusiasm for the craft of moviemaking itself", writes Bowles, "and is in marked contrast to the tone and style of most of his films. Perhaps Lumet's signature as a director is his work with actors – and his exceptional ability to draw high-quality, sometimes extraordinary performances from even the most unexpected quarters" Jake Coyle, a writer for the Associated Press, agrees: "While Lumet has for years gone relatively underappreciated, actors have consistently turned in some of their most memorable performances under his stewardship. From Katharine Hepburn to Faye Dunaway, Henry Fonda to Paul Newman, Lumet is known as an actor's director", and to some, like Ali MacGraw, he is considered "every actor's dream".

In the belief that Lumet's "compelling stories and unforgettable performances were his strong suit", director and producer Steven Spielberg described Lumet as "one of the greatest directors in the long history of film". Al Pacino, upon hearing of Lumet's death, stated that with his films, "he leaves a great legacy, but more than that, to the people close to him, he will remain the most civilized of humans and the kindest man I have ever known". Boston Herald writer James Verniere observes that "at a time when the American film industry is intent on seeing how low it can go, Sidney Lumet remains a master of the morally complex American drama". Following his death, fellow New York directors Woody Allen and Martin Scorsese both paid tribute to Lumet. Allen called him the "quintessential New York film-maker", while Scorsese said "our vision of the city has been enhanced and deepened by classics like Serpico, Dog Day Afternoon and, above all, the remarkable Prince of the City". Lumet also drew praise from New York mayor Michael Bloomberg, who called him "one of the great chroniclers of our city".

He did not win an individual Academy Award, although he did receive an Academy Honorary Award in 2005 and 14 of his films were nominated for various Oscars, such as Network, which was nominated for 10, winning 4. In 2005, Lumet received an Academy Award for Lifetime Achievement for his "brilliant services to screenwriters, performers, and the art of the motion picture.

A few months after Lumet's death in April 2011, TV commentator Lawrence O'Donnell aired a tribute to Lumet, and a retrospective celebration of his work was held at New York's Lincoln Center with the appearance of numerous speakers and film stars. In October 2011, the organization Human Rights First inaugurated its "Sidney Lumet Award for Integrity in Entertainment" for the TV show, The Good Wife, along with giving awards to two Middle East activists who had worked for freedom and democracy. Lumet had worked with Human Rights First on a media project related to the depiction of torture and interrogation on television.

Personal life and death 
Lumet was married four times; the first three marriages ended in divorce. He was married to actress Rita Gam from 1949 to 1955; to artist and heiress Gloria Vanderbilt from 1956 to 1963; to Gail Jones (daughter of Lena Horne) from 1963 to 1978; and to Mary Bailey Gimbel (ex-wife of Peter Gimbel) from 1980 until his death. He had two daughters by Jones: Amy, who was married to P.J. O'Rourke from 1990 to 1993, and actress/screenwriter Jenny, who had a leading role in his film Q&A. She also wrote the screenplay for the film Rachel Getting Married (2008), as well as co-creating two television series with Alex Kurtzman, The Silence of the Lambs sequel Clarice, and Star Trek: Strange New Worlds.

Lumet died at the age of 86 on April 9, 2011, in his residence in Manhattan from lymphoma. When asked in a 1997 interview about how he wanted to "go out", Lumet responded, "I don't think about it. I'm not religious. I do know that I don't want to take up any space. Burn me up and scatter my ashes over Katz's Delicatessen".

References

External links

 
 
 
 "Last Word" New York Times April 21, 2011, video (14 minutes)
 Archive of American Television, TV Legends interview, 1999 video, 6-parts, 3 hours
 Fresh Air interview from 2006 (audio)
 Sidney Lumet: The Prince of New York City

1924 births
2011 deaths
20th-century American male actors
21st-century American male actors
Academy Honorary Award recipients
American male film actors
Film producers from New York (state)
Film directors from New York City
United States Army personnel of World War II
American people of Polish-Jewish descent
American male screenwriters
American television directors
Television producers from New York City
American theatre directors
Jewish theatre directors
Best Director Golden Globe winners
Directors of Golden Bear winners
Deaths from cancer in New York (state)
Camp Rising Sun alumni
Columbia University alumni
Deaths from lymphoma
Jewish American male actors
Writers from Philadelphia
Military personnel from Philadelphia
Yiddish theatre performers
Screenwriters from New York (state)
Screenwriters from Pennsylvania
Television producers from Pennsylvania
Film producers from Pennsylvania
People from the Lower East Side
Lumet family
United States Army soldiers
21st-century American Jews